Muhlenbergia schreberi, the nimblewill, is a grass species in the family Poaceae native to North America.

Description 
The nimblewill has purple to green culms that stand erect, and its spikelets are about 2-8" long. Its panicles are greenish and contain a rachis. Each spikelet has 1-2 glumes that are 0.2 mm long and afterwards the spikelets disarticulate and fall to the ground. The florets of the nimblewill are pollinated by the wind.

Turf grass
It is considered a southern turf type lawn grass and turns brown in the winter. This makes it a lesser grass for northern climate lawns. It is shade tolerant and tends to spread aggressively once established. Because of its durability in moderately cold temperatures and invasive bug species, this grass can be used to protect certain crops in the American southeast.

Ecology
This species is eaten by the bug Stenodema vicinum, and is also eaten by cattle and other hoofed herbivores.  The seeds can be distributed by sticking to animal hoofs or shoes. Nimblewill grows in light sun and partial shade, and prefer a loamy soil and moist conditions. Nimblewill is common around Illinois where it is native. The nimblewill is sometimes found around Minnesota. Some insects are known to eat nimblewill, like Hysteroneura setariae, Conocephalus brevipennis and Hymenarcys nervosa. Birds that are known to eat this plant are tree sparrows, song sparrows and turkeys.

References

External links

Jepson Manual Treatment
Types of Centipede Grass
USDA Plants Database
extension.psu.edu

schreberi
Lawn grasses
Flora of North America
Garden plants of North America
Taxa named by Johann Friedrich Gmelin